More… is the second studio album by American singer Montell Jordan, released on August 27, 1996 through Def Jam Recordings. Though the album performed not as well on the US Billboard charts as his previous album, only making it to #47 on the Billboard 200, More… nevertheless was certified gold by the RIAA on May 21, 1997. The album also spawned three hit singles, "I Like", "Falling" and "What's on Tonight", the later two being certified gold by the RIAA. "Bounce 2 This" also appeared on the ending credits to The Nutty Professor.

Track listing

Personnel 
David A. Belgrave - marketing

Charts

Weekly charts

Year-end charts

Certifications

References 

1996 albums
Def Jam Recordings albums
Montell Jordan albums